The University of Oklahoma Sooners football team has had 388 players drafted into the National Football League (NFL) since the league began holding drafts in 1936. This includes 44 players taken in the first round and five number one overall picks: Lee Roy Selmon in 1976, Billy Sims in 1980, Sam Bradford in 2010, Baker Mayfield in 2018, and Kyler Murray in 2019. In the 2010 NFL Draft, Oklahoma became the only school in history to have three players selected in the first four picks of the draft.

Each NFL franchise seeks to add new players through the annual NFL Draft. The team with the worst record the previous year picks first, the next-worst team second, and so on. Teams that did not make the playoffs are ordered by their regular-season record with any remaining ties broken by strength of schedule. Playoff participants are sequenced after non-playoff teams, based on their round of elimination (wild card, division, conference, and Super Bowl).

Before the merger agreements in 1966, the American Football League (AFL) operated in direct competition with the NFL and held a separate draft. This led to a massive bidding war over top prospects between the two leagues. As part of the merger agreement on June 8, 1966, the two leagues would hold a multiple round "Common Draft". Once the AFL officially merged with the NFL in 1970, the "Common Draft" simply became the NFL Draft.

A total of 31 former Sooners have been selected to at least one Pro Bowl, 18 to more than one, and 35 former Sooners have won a league championship.



Key

Selections

Notes

References
General

 
 

Specific

Oklahoma

Oklahoma Sooners NFL Draft